Böğrüeğri is a village in Tarsus  district of Mersin Province, Turkey. It is situated in the Taurus Mountains (Cilicia of the antiquity) plains at the north bank of Berdan Dam reservoir. The population of Boynu eğri was 528 as of 2011.

References

Villages in Tarsus District